Naxibacter suwonensis is a Gram-negative aerobic motile with a single flagellum, and rod-shaped bacterium which was isolated with Massilia jejuensis from air samples on the Jeju Island and Suwon region of Korea.

Etymology
Its specific name comes from Suwon, the region where the type strain was first found.

References

Burkholderiales
Bacteria described in 2010